Per Ragnar Theodor Persenius (born 27 June 1952) was the  Bishop of Uppsala from 2000 till his retirement in 2019. He previously headed the Church of Sweden's Department of Theology and Ecumenism.

Biography 

The son of Walter Persenius, pastor of Ullånger, he was born in Uppsala and grew up in Jämtland and Härjedalen. After attending Fjellstedtska School in Uppsala, he studied law, philosophy and theology, receiving a doctorate from Lund University in 1988.

Ordained in 1973, he first served as parish priest of Bro (1973–1976) before becoming educational advisor for the Diocese of Uppsala (1977–1980). Other appointments have included Parish Priest of Norrstrand, Karlstad, Church Secretary for Uppsala, the Church of Sweden's director for theological affairs, and head of its theology and ecumenism department (1993–1998). Before his ordination as bishop, he headed the Stora Sköndal Foundation in Stockholm.

Persenius lives with his wife Ingrid in a house near Uppsala Cathedral. He has a daughter, Susanna, but his son Martin died after a lengthy illness in 2007, causing him severe grief but reinforcing his faith. He came second in the elections for Archbishop of Uppsala in 2006 but is encouraging wider participation of candidates for the next elections in spring 2014. He likes to relax at his summer house in Söderhamn where he can paint, build and shovel snow.

Published works

References

External links
"Biskop Ragnar": Persenius' blog since October 2012. 

Swedish Lutheran bishops
1952 births
Living people
People from Uppsala